Thomas Prestall (by 1503 – 1551), of Poling, Houghton, Sussex and London, was an English politician.

He was a Member of Parliament (MP) for Arundel in 1529.

References

1551 deaths
People from Arun District
Politicians from London
English MPs 1529–1536
Year of birth uncertain